Hamdan Al-Shamrani (born 14 December 1996) is a Saudi Arabian professional footballer who plays as a left back for Pro League club Al-Ittihad and the Saudi Arabia national team.

He started his career with Al-Ahli and made his debut in the 2017 AFC Champions League. After 2 seasons with the first team, he joined fellow Pro League club Al-Faisaly on a three-year contract.

Al-Shamrani received his first call-up for the Saudi Arabia national team for the 2019 AFC Asian Cup.

Career statistics

Club

International
Statistics accurate as of match played 10 September 2019.

Honours

Al-Ittihad
Saudi Super Cup: 2022

References

External links
 

1996 births
Living people
Sportspeople from Jeddah
Saudi Arabian footballers
Association football defenders
Association football midfielders
Saudi Professional League players
Al-Ahli Saudi FC players
Al-Faisaly FC players
Ittihad FC players
Saudi Arabia international footballers
Saudi Arabia youth international footballers
2019 AFC Asian Cup players